Winter Rose is a 1996 fantasy novel by American writer Patricia A. McKillip.  It was nominated for the 1996 Nebula Award and 1997 Locus Award for Best Fantasy Novel, and was a finalist for the 1997 Mythopoeic Fantasy Award for Adult Literature.  In 2006, McKillip published its sequel, Solstice Wood.

Plot summary
When Rois Melior, the wild daughter of a widowed father, first sees Corbet Lynn step from the woods, she is attracted to him despite a sense that he is not what he appears to be.  As he rebuilds his family's decaying estate, Rois and her sister Laurel both befriend and eventually fall in love with Corbet.  The seasons progress as calm, sensible Laurel begins to change, forgetting her earlier betrothal and becoming obsessed with Corbet.

In the winter, Corbet mysteriously disappears and Laurel begins to waste away, much like her mother did.  The town believes that the curse that Corbet's grandfather laid upon his descendants has claimed him.  Only Rois, who has been able to slip in and out of the woods since she was a child, is able to chase after Corbet and save him and her sister.  But the power of the fey is a tricky magic, and even as Rois untangles him from his past, she is in constant danger of being ensnared herself.

Nominations
1997 Mythopoeic Fantasy Award for Adult Literature Finalist
1997 Locus Award for Best Fantasy Novel
1996 Nebula Award

See also
 Tam Lin
 Elfland

References

External links
 

1996 American novels
Books with cover art by Kinuko Y. Craft
American fantasy novels
Novels by Patricia A. McKillip
Ace Books books